The 77th Indianapolis 500 was held at the Indianapolis Motor Speedway in Speedway, Indiana on Sunday, May 30, 1993. Emerson Fittipaldi took the lead with 16 laps to go, and won his second career Indy 500 victory. The race was sanctioned by USAC and was part of the 1993 PPG Indy Car World Series. Several sidebar stories during the month complemented one of the most competitive Indy 500 races in recent years.

Much of the pre-race attention for the month focused heavily on rookie Nigel Mansell, the reigning Formula One World Champion, who switched to the CART Indy car series during the offseason. A large international media contingent arrived at the track creating a huge frenzy surrounding the Englishman. Mansell was competitive all afternoon, and was leading the race on lap 184 as the field was coming to a restart. His inexperience on oval circuits, however, led to him misjudging the restart speed and he was quickly passed down the main stretch by Fittipaldi, which proved to be the winning move.

Fittipaldi, Arie Luyendyk and Mansell finished 1st–2nd–3rd, the first time foreign-born drivers swept the top three finishing positions since 1915.

After hinting about retirement in 1991 (and later retracting retirement plans in 1992), four-time Indy 500 winner A. J. Foyt entered the 1993 race and participated in the first week of practice. On the morning of pole day qualifying, rookie Robby Gordon, driving a Foyt team car, crashed during a practice session. The incident led to Foyt deciding to retire from Indy car racing after a 35-year career.

The 1993 race would be the final competitive drives at Indy for both Mario Andretti and Al Unser Sr. Andretti led the most laps, but faded at the end to a 6th-place finish. Unser also led laps during the race, en route to a 12th-place finish. Andretti would drop out of the 1994 race, and retired after the 1994 season. Unser abruptly retired during practice for the 1994 race. Also grabbing headlines during qualifying was the plight of defending CART champion and 1986 Indy winner Bobby Rahal. After struggling to get his car up to speed, Rahal was bumped from the field on the final day of time trials.

Raul Boesel led 18 laps for owner Dick Simon, the first time a Simon-owned car ever led the Indy 500. Boesel took the lead at the start and had one of the fastest cars during the race. His chances for victory, however, were foiled due to two pit stop penalties, which dropped him to the back of the pack. He worked his way back up to a remarkable 4th-place finish, but in post race interviews, felt the race had been stolen from him, saying "in my mind, this race is mine."

Background
Sweeping changes were seen at Indy for 1993, both at the track and amongst the competitors. After the many crashes during the 1992 race, rule changes were implemented to slow cars down and to better protect drivers in crashes. Among the noticeable changes were smaller rear wings, and the banning of the wheel disc inserts. In addition, the front noses of the cars were changed, intended to protect the drivers' feet in a crash. Cockpits were to be redesigned to allow drivers to pull their feet back before impact.

Also making news at the Speedway was the official announcement of the Brickyard 400, to be held in 1994. Tony George and Bill France Jr. jointly announced the race on April 14 during a ceremony at the museum, a few weeks before opening day. The race would give the Speedway two major events annually starting in 1994.

Beginning in 1993, a speed limit in the pit lane (100 mph) was enforced at all times. In the previous year, it was only in force during caution periods.

Driver and team changes

During the offseason, four-time Indy 500 winner Rick Mears announced his retirement from racing. Penske driver Paul Tracy elevated into the ride, taking over full-time, where he had previously driven part-time in 1991–1992. Tracy would earn his first career Indy car victory at Long Beach, the last race before Indianapolis.

The biggest story going into the season surrounded Newman/Haas Racing. Michael Andretti left the CART series and signed with McLaren to drive in Formula One. Taking Andretti's place would be reigning Formula One World Champion Nigel Mansell. Mansell came to the American open wheel series with considerable fanfare and huge media attention. Mansell joined fellow former World Driving champion Mario Andretti as teammates. Mansell won the CART season-opener at Surfers Paradise, but was involved in a crash during practice for the Valvoline 200 at Phoenix. He suffered an injured back, and sat out that event. Since he missed the Phoenix race, Indianapolis would serve as Mansell's first-ever oval race start. Mansell underwent back surgery on April 28, forcing him to miss rookie orientation, and the opening weekend of practice at Indy.

Truesports racing was absorbed by Rahal-Hogan Racing, and driver Bobby Rahal took over the existing Truesports chassis program to start out the season. Rahal entered the race as the defending CART series champion, and was coming off a second-place finish at Long Beach.

Galles Racing maintained its driver lineup for 1993. Defending Indy 500 winner Al Unser Jr. returned, as did Danny Sullivan. The team, however, scrapped the Galmer chassis program. Kevin Cogan joined the team at Indy only, making it a three-car Indy 500 effort.

At Chip Ganassi Racing, Eddie Cheever departed, and was replaced by Arie Luyendyk. In 1992, Luyendyk was out of a full-time ride, and drove for Ganassi at Indy and Michigan only. For 1993, Luyendyk was back with the team, this time for a full-season ride. After his devastating crash in 1992, Nelson Piquet returned to Indy after a lengthy rehabilitation. Former winners Tom Sneva and Gordon Johncock also retired during the off-season, though Sneva did arrive at the track hoping for an outside chance to land a ride.

After two years of retirement rumors, four-time winner A. J. Foyt entered once again as a driver, looking to qualify for his 36th consecutive Indy 500. Rookie driver Robby Gordon was entered in a second Foyt team car. The other active four-time winner, Al Unser Sr., secured a ride with King Racing. The previous two years, Unser had entered the month without a ride.

Track improvements
Following the 1992 race, an extensive construction project was undertaken at the Speedway. The "apron" lane at the bottom of the track was removed, and replaced with a new separated warm-up lane, similar to the one at Nazareth Speedway. A grass strip physically separated the track surface from the new warm up lane. Rumble strips were installed below the white line to discourage drivers from dipping below the white line. The improvements were made in an effort to curtail speeds, and reduce impact angles, but were criticized by some who said that it made the track too narrow and would make passing more difficult.

The entire outer retaining wall and catch fence was replaced, mostly in anticipation of the 1994 Brickyard 400. Other physical improvements included new grandstands at the north end of the circuit, observation mounds in the infield, and the completion of a new championship-caliber golf course on the grounds, designed by Pete Dye called Brickyard Crossing.

Race schedule

Practice: week 1

Opening Day: Saturday May 8
The traditional opening day ceremonies were capped off when Dick Simon Racing was the first team out on the track (for the 6th consecutive year). Marco Greco was the first driver to complete a lap, with the rest of the Simon cars following in a diamond formation.

Shortly before 3 p.m., Jeff Andretti entered the warm up lane in turn three too fast, and slid back onto the track into the path of Roberto Guerrero's car. Guerrero went high to avoid Andretti's spinning car, and brushed the outside wall. Neither driver was injured.

Mario Andretti (222.124 mph) was the fastest car of the day.

Sunday May 9
Paul Tracy was the fastest of the day. Jeff Andretti blew an engine, starting a huge fire at the back of his car, which he was able to guide back to the pits.

Monday May 10
Team Penske led the speed charts, with Paul Tracy (220.724 mph) first and Emerson Fittipaldi (220.691 mph) second. Nelson Piquet was 9th-fastest before he clipped the outside wall exiting turn 2.

Tuesday May 11
Arie Luyendyk set the fastest lap thus far for the month at 225.89 mph. Hiro Matsushita and Paul Tracy both survived separate spins at the pit entrance without hitting anything. At about 1:30 p.m., A. J. Foyt took his first shake down laps of the month, reaching a top lap of 212 mph.

Wednesday May 12
Rookie Nigel Mansell passed his physical and began his four-phase drivers test. He breezed through all four phases, with a top lap of 218.579 mph. Though he was unable to attend the Rookie Orientation Program, Mansell received special permission from USAC to skip the program, due to his extensive auto racing experience and expertise.

Robbie Buhl crashed in turn two, suffering a concussion, which sidelined him until May 19. Ross Bentley and Olivier Grouillard also spun out on the track.

Raul Boesel topped the speed chart for the day at 224.461 mph.

Thursday May 13
Arie Luyendyk once again set the fastest lap thus far for the month, raising it to 226.182 mph. The day was without incident, except for Robby Gordon, who "whitewalled" the outside wall at the southchute, suffering minor suspension damage.

Mario Andretti was second fastest (225.423 mph), the second driver of the month over 225 mph. In his first full day of practice, Nigel Mansell was 6th fastest, with lap of 224.372 mph.

Friday May 14
Raul Boesel (225.592 mph) topped the speed chart for the final day of practice before pole day. Nigel Mansell continued to impress, posting the second-fastest lap of the day (224.949 mph). Mario Andretti was third, but Arie Luyendyk was only 9th fastest.

Incidents on the track involved three drivers. At 12:20 p.m., Didier Theys spun out of turn 4 and hit the inside wall, bouncing back to the middle of the frontstretch. The car was heavily damaged, but Theys suffered only a bruised thigh. At 1:53 p.m., Ross Bentley abruptly stopped on the main stretch, with the car on fire. He quickly scrambled to exit the cockpit. A fuel pressure regulator broke, spilling fuel, and igniting. Bentley suffered first and second-degree burns to his face and hands, and he would sit out the rest of the month. Late in the day, Mario Andretti spun in the warmup lane, but did not make contact.

Time Trials: weekend 1

Pole day – Saturday May 15

A.J. Foyt retires
Pole day was warm and sunny. At 8:11 a.m., during the morning practice session, rookie Robby Gordon, driving the #41 Foyt entry, spun exiting turn 1, then brushed the wall with the nose of the car. The car continued to slide, righted itself forward, and slid along the outside wall in turn two. Gordon was uninjured. About two hours later, unexpectedly, A. J. Foyt donned his racing suit for the final time, and took to the track for a final "farewell" lap. After the Gordon crash, Foyt decided he was unable to fully concentrate his efforts on both driving and running the team successfully, and after previously hinting at retirement in 1991, he made his retirement official effective immediately.

An emotional and teary-eyed Foyt was interviewed by Tom Carnegie over the public address system, giving his farewell speech to the fans:

Open of qualifications
Promptly at 11:00 a.m., time trials began with Stan Fox the first driver in line. After three inconsistent laps, Fox waved off. Due to the challenging track layout (without the apron) and rules changes, several drivers and teams were uneasy about qualifying speeds and many waved off. Mario Andretti was the second car out, and completed his run at 223.414 mph, putting him on the provisional pole position.

In the first hour and fifteen minutes, only four cars completed runs. Nine cars waved off, including Arie Luyendyk, and Gary Bettenhausen wrecked on his fourth lap. At 12:30 p.m., Raul Boesel put his car on the front row with a run of 222.379 mph. Nigel Mansell waved off his first run, after three laps in the 218-219 mph range. At 1 p.m., with ten cars in the field, the track became quiet, as drivers awaited better conditions.

At 5 p.m., time trials resumed. Arie Luyendyk secured the pole position with a speed of 223.967 mph. Luyendyk bumped Mario Andretti to the middle of the front row, and Raul Boesel held on for the outside of the front row. Nigel Mansell was the next car out, making his second attempt. After a first lap of 221.811 mph, Mansell wildly veered to the middle of the track out of turn four (fearing that he brushed the wall exiting turn 4). His second lap dropped to 219 mph, and his four-lap average ended up 220.255 mph, good enough for 8th starting position in the middle of row 3.

Emerson Fittipaldi, Kevin Cogan, and Stefan Johansson were the only other cars to complete runs. The day ended with 15 cars in the field, and Pruett (216.794 mph) as the slowest. Bobby Rahal was among the drivers not yet in the field.

Second day – Sunday May 16
Several drivers who waved off on pole day completed runs on the second day. Among those who qualified comfortably were Jeff Andretti, Lyn St. James, and Teo Fabi. After struggling all week with the Truesports chassis, Bobby Rahal completed a run at 217.140 mph.

With the field filled to 26 cars, Mark Smith (214.356 mph) was the slowest car in the field. The only incident of the day involved Davy Jones, who blew an engine on the first lap of his qualifying attempt. The hot fluids entered the cockpit, and Jones scrambled to stop the car against the inside wall near the pit entrance and climbed out.

Practice: week 2

Monday – May 17
A light day of track activity saw John Andretti shaking down a car for Willy T. Ribbs at Walker Motorsports. Andretti hit 220.157 mph in the car, the fastest non-qualified car of the afternoon.

Tuesday – May 18
Rain kept cars off the track until 3 p.m. An abbreviated practice session saw only 15 cars on the track, with Teo Fabi (223.381 mph) the fastest of the day; his fastest lap all month. Willy T. Ribbs took his first laps of the month, and first laps since 1991, topping out in the 210 mph range.

Wednesday – May 19
Éric Bachelart wrecked early in the session in turn 1, but he suffered only minor injuries. After being cleared to drive Wednesday morning, Robbie Buhl wrecked again, this time suffering an injured foot. To date, Dale Coyne Racing had now suffered four crashes in the month.

Emerson Fittipaldi, testing race setups, set the second-fastest lap of the month, at 226.051 mph, faster than the pole position speed. Olivier Grouillard, Eddie Cheever, and Jim Crawford led the speed chart for the non-qualified drivers.

Thursday – May 20
The fastest lap of the month was turned in by Mario Andretti, who blistered the track at 227.118 mph. Jim Crawford (221.212 mph) set the pace for the non-qualified drivers. The day ended 15 minutes early due to rain.

Friday – May 21
The final full day of practice saw heavy activity. A total of 33 cars ran 1,693 laps during the session, and the field passed 20,000 practice laps for the month. Nigel Mansell (225.468 mph) was the fastest-car of the day, and Robby Gordon (221.272 mph) led the non-qualified cars.

The only incident of the day involved Dominic Dobson, who spun to the inside of turn one, and lightly tapped the outside wall. The car was not damaged, and Dobson was not injured.

Time Trials: weekend 2

Third Day – Saturday May 22
At the opening of time trials, Eddie Cheever was the first car to complete a qualifying run, It was his third and final attempt in the #99 Turley Motorsports entry. His speed of 216.415 mph, was disappointingly slow compared to his previous practice laps. Jim Crawford put a third King Racing entry in the field, with a comfortable speed of 217.612 mph.

John Andretti signed last-minute to drive the #84 Foyt entry, and quickly posted a speed of 221.746 mph, the fastest car of the afternoon, and 6th-fastest in the entire field. Robby Gordon, now the primary driver for Foyt, followed with a run of 220.085 mph.

At 5:17 p.m., Geoff Brabham easily bumped rookie Mark Smith from the field. Smith turned around and re-qualified his back-up car at 217.150 mph, bumping Eddie Cheever. The bumping continued with Willy T. Ribbs posting a solid run of 217.711 mph to bump Olivier Grouillard. Eddie Cheever took out his backup #99T car for an attempt (his fourth attempt of the month), but waved off. The day ended with Dominic Dobson bumping out Scott Pruett.

With questionable weather in the forecast for Sunday, the field was filled to 33 cars, with Bobby Rahal on the bubble.

Bump Day – Sunday May 23
With the field already filled to 33 cars, Bump Day, the final day of time trials, started with unfavorable weather conditions. Wind gusts up to 30 mph were observed, which kept cars off the track most of the early afternoon. 1986 winner, and defending CART champion Bobby Rahal (217.140 mph) started the day on the bubble, as the slowest car in the field. His R/H chassis was proving to be uncompetitive in superspeedway trim.

In the morning, Team Menard offered a spare car deal for Bobby Rahal, who was in considerable danger of failing to qualify. Rahal declined, opting instead to roll out his backup car, and start getting it up to speed. After a difficult time in qualifying, Eddie Cheever quit the Turley team, and took the vacant ride at Menard.

Qualifying began at 5 p.m., with Eddie Cheever first out. Though his speed was seemingly fast enough to bump his way into the field, the crew waved off the run. Bobby Rahal remained on the bubble. Over the next half-hour, four drivers (Didier Theys, Scott Pruett, John Paul Jr., and Éric Bachelart) all attempted to bump Bobby Rahal from the field. John Paul Jr. blew his engine, and the rest were too slow and waved off. Rahal's team had to keep pulling his backup car out of line, and moving to the rear, increasing the risk that he would not be able to re-qualify if he got bumped.

With fifteen minutes left in the day, Eddie Cheever took to the track, overall, his record sixth qualifying attempt of the month. At 217.599 mph, he bumped Bobby Rahal from the field. The move put rookie Mark Smith (217.150 mph) on the bubble. At 5:54 p.m., Didier Theys took to the track, and completed his run at 217.752 mph. Theys bumped Smith, and added to the lore of the Curse of the Smiths at the Indy 500.

With just seconds remaining until the 6 o'clock gun, Bobby Rahal made it to the front of the qualifying line. At 5:59 p.m., he pulled away for his warm up laps. Kevin Cogan (217.230 mph) was now on the bubble. Rahal's first lap was completed at 217.360 mph, just fast enough to bump his way in. However, his second lap dropped to 216.820 mph. His third lap (214.782 mph) was the dagger, and Rahal failed to qualify.

Carburetion Day – Thursday May 27
The final practice session saw Scott Brayton (223.547 mph) set the fastest lap. Nigel Mansell was second, and Raul Boesel third. No incidents were reported, but a few drivers, namely Stan Fox, reported relatively minor mechanical issues.

First alternate Bobby Rahal did not take the opportunity to practice. Paul Tracy was absent for the day, due to the birth of his daughter in Toronto. Emerson Fittipaldi shook down Tracy's car for a handful of practice laps.

Galles Racing won the Miller Pit Stop Contest with driver Al Unser Jr.

Starting grid

Alternates
 First alternate:  Mark Smith  (#25, #25T) – Bumped
 Second alternate:  Bobby Rahal (#1, #1T) – #1 Bumped, #1T too slow

Failed to Qualify
  Olivier Grouillard  (#29, #18T) – #29 Bumped, 18T did not attempt to qualify
  Scott Pruett (#45, #46) – #45 Bumped, #46 too slow
  Éric Bachelart (#32, #39) – #32 Practice Crash, #39 Too slow
  Rocky Moran (#43) – Too slow
  John Paul Jr. (#93) – Blown engine during qualifications
  Buddy Lazier (#20) – Blown engine during qualifications
  Ross Bentley (#39) – car fire during practice
  Robbie Buhl (#19, 19T) – practice crash
  A. J. Foyt (#14) – retired on pole day morning, did not attempt to qualify
  Mike Groff ( #1T, #26) – #1T Practice only, #26 did not practice or attempt to qualify
  Brian Bonner (#98) – did not attempt to qualify

Race recap

Pre-race

After the tumultuous off-season, and surprising events during time trials, the 500 would line up with several familiar drivers on the sidelines for one reason or another. A. J. Foyt, Rick Mears, Gordon Johncock, and Tom Sneva had retired; Bobby Rahal and Scott Pruett both failed to qualify; and Michael Andretti's commitments in Formula One prevented him from entering the race.

After the miserable cold weather from the previous year, race day dawned sunny and warm. There was pre-race concern about approaching precipitation, and the forecast was questionable. Some teams prepared for a possible rain-shortened race. However, the rain never arrived, and the race was completed without interruption.

Start
At the green flag, polesitter Arie Luyendyk and Raul Boesel drag-raced down the frontstretch, with Mario Andretti dropping back into third. Boesel got the edge, and grabbed the lead into turn 1. The entire field circulated through the first lap cleanly, and started to pick up the pace. Boesel began lapping the backmarkers on lap 8, meanwhile Andretti moved past Luyendyk to take second place. On lap 16, Jim Crawford spun exiting turn 2. He flat-spotted his tires, but did not make contact. He drove back to the pits, and re-entered the race.

Under the caution most of the leaders pitted. Kevin Cogan stayed out, and inherited the lead. In doing so, Cogan accomplished a rare feat in which the slowest qualifier in the field led lap(s) during the race. In the pits, Raul Boesel was among those who pitted, and in the process, the crew was able to remove a hot dog wrapper that was blocking the radiator inlet. As Boesel was exiting his pit stall, he was momentarily blocked when Scott Goodyear pulled out of his stall. Further down the lane, Mario Andretti slowly pulled out of his pit box, and was ahead of Boesel. Both cars entered the warm up lane together. Boesel was going much faster and slipped by Andretti in the warm up lane. Boesel was unaware and was not informed by the officials that Mario had crossed the blend line first.

After the field went back to green on lap 21, the black flag was displayed for Boesel. A controversial stop-and-go penalty was assessed to Boesel. Confusion hovered over the reason for penalty. Owner Dick Simon was initially informed it was for speeding in the pits, but then it was changed to passing under the yellow. Boesel darted into the pits to serve the penalty, and fell all the way back to the rear of the field. He lost a lap in the process.

First half
With Al Unser, Sr. leading on lap 31, Danny Sullivan, suffering from a pushing condition, went high in turn three and smacked the outside wall. A piece of the suspension pierced through the side of the tub, and narrowly missed puncturing his leg. Danny would not return as a driver in 1994 but did one last time in 1995. Nelson Piquet, who returned to Indy after his bad crash in 1992, dropped out with a blown engine.

Mario Andretti led the field back to green on lap 36, Arie Luyendyk ran second, and Emerson Fittipaldi third. Mario led comfortably for the next 15 laps. On lap 47, the leaders approached traffic, and Luyendyk passed Andretti to take the lead into turn one. Nigel Mansell began showing strength, passing Fittipaldi for third, then closing in his teammate Mario Andretti in second. Down the main stretch on lap 50, Mansell dove inside Mario for position, but Mario held him off, sweeping down in front in turn 1. Three laps later, Mansell finally got by Mario in turn 1, after a hot pursuit. Andretti pitted one lap later. On lap 56, Mansell passed Luyendyk coming out of turn 2 to take the lead for the first time. However, Mansell ducked into the pits on that same lap, and was not credited with leading a lap yet.

During the sequence of green flag pit stops, the lead changed hands several times. After all of the leaders pitted, Nigel Mansell took over the lead.

The yellow came out for debris on lap 89, and after pit stops, Mario Andretti was back in the lead. Nigel Mansell overshot his pit stall, and his crew had to wheel him back to administer service. Mansell dropped to 6th place after a 40-second pit stop.

The green came out on lap 94, but only lasted two laps. Scott Brayton and Paul Tracy tangled entering turn three, and Tracy was forced into the outside wall. Brayton came down on Tracy, pinching him to the grass, and clipped his front wheel.

Second half
On lap 128, the only multi-car crash of the day occurred. Jeff Andretti and Roberto Guerrero came together in turn three, with both cars crashing out. Leader Mario Andretti ducked into the pits, however, he entered the pit lane when it was closed. He was given the black flag and assessed a stop-and-go penalty. After the shuffle, Al Unser Jr. took over the lead, with Andretti second. Meanwhile, Raul Boesel was now back on the lead lap in 8th place.

Robby Gordon brought out the yellow on lap 169 when he stalled on the track with a broken gearbox. Under the yellow, Raul Boesel entered the pits while they were closed, and was assessed a stop-and-go penalty; however, he did not lose any considerable track position.

After the shuffle from the final sequence of pit stops, Nigel Mansell was now back in the lead, with Emerson Fittipaldi second, and Arie Luyendyk third.

Finish
On lap 182, the yellow came out when Lyn St. James stalled in turn 4. Nigel Mansell was leading Emerson Fittipaldi and Arie Luyendyk. On lap 184, the field was ready to go back to green. Mansell, driving in his first-ever Indy car oval race, was inexperienced in restarts, and was too hesitant bringing the field back to green. He exited turn four too slow, and immediately Fittipaldi and Luyendyk were on his rear bumper. Mansell realized he was a sitting duck, and swept to the inside of the track to attempt to block. Fittipaldi quickly diced around, and got by on the outside to take the lead. Going into turn one, Luyendyk precariously swept by Mansell on the outside and took over second place.

With Fittipaldi pulling away, the laps dwindled down, and Mansell's chances for victory started to slip away. On lap 192, Mansell slid high exiting turn two, and "whitewalled" the outside wall. A caution came out for the contact, but Mansell stayed out on the track. His suspension suffered minor damage, but he continued.

The green flag came out for the final time with 5 laps to go. Emerson Fittipaldi got the jump on the restart, and pulled away to a comfortable lead. Fittipaldi won his second Indy 500 by 2.8 seconds over Arie Luyendyk. Nigel Mansell held on to finish third, while Raul Boesel worked his way all the way back to the front-runners to come home fourth.

Nigel Mansell became the first rookie to finish the full 500 miles since Donnie Allison in 1970. He won the rookie of the year award, and led a total of 34 laps during the race. His late-race miscue cost him two positions, and was largely chalked up as a 'rookie mistake.' During post-race interviews, Mansell claimed he was trying to follow the rules, waiting for the green flag to come out before he accelerated, and he was surprised that Fittipaldi and Luyendyk had caught up such ground on him so quickly. He claimed that "everybody, if you like, cheats on the restarts, and I'm trying to do it by the rules...and I lost the lead..." However, he did not protest the results, and was pleased with his performance. Later that same year, Mansell won the Michigan 500 and went on to win the 1993 CART IndyCar championship. Mansell was honored with the Driver of the Year award, the Autosport International Racing Driver Award and an ESPY.

Post race
Race winner Emerson Fittipaldi, who previously won in 1989 pulled into victory lane to celebrate his win with team owner Roger Penske. It would be the final time a driver celebrated in the "hydraulic lift" version of Indy's victory lane, as a new one was built for 1994. As Fittipaldi emerged from the cockpit, he immediately began the traditional winner's interview, being given by Jack Arute live on ABC-TV. Fittipaldi broke a decades-old tradition, and chose not to drink the ceremonial milk in victory lane, a tradition that dates back to 1936. Fittipaldi instead controversially drank orange juice, which he himself provided, in order to promote the Brazilian citrus industry. Arute immediately shifted his questioning to the milk snub, and the exchange on live television went as follows:

Fittipaldi refused to even hold the milk bottle, pushing it away at least three times from the presenter. After the interview was concluded, and after television cameras had been turned off, Fittipaldi finally did take a sip from the bottle of milk at the direction of his owner Roger Penske, however, not before a controversy boiled. Fan reaction to the snub was highly negative, and they charged Fittipaldi with breaking the popular and long-standing Indy tradition for personal gain. He quickly gained hecklers, and was booed the following week during driver introductions at Milwaukee. A few days after the race, Fittipaldi issued an apology statement, and donated the $5,000 prize from the American Dairy Association of Indiana to charity.

Race results

 – Former Winner,  – Rookie

*C Chassis: G=Galmer, L=Lola, P=Penske

*E Engine: B=Buick, C=Ilmor-Chevrolet, F=Cosworth-Ford, M=Menard (Buick)

All cars utilized Goodyear tires.

Race statistics
There were 23 lead changes involving a race record 12 different leaders. Kevin Cogan, the slowest qualifier, led 3 laps, the first time since 1923 that the slowest driver in the field led a lap at Indy.

The ten cars finishing on the lead lap was the most in Indy history up to that point, although it was not the most cars completing the full 500 miles (the record was 16 in 1959). However, since the implementation of the "pack-up" rule during caution periods in 1979, and the fact that extra time to complete the 500 miles was eliminated in the mid-1970s, ten cars completing 500 miles on the lead lap broke the CART-era record of four (1980, 1986, 1992).

The field completed a then race-record 5,733 out of a possible 6,600 laps (86.9%) for a full 500-mile race; a record that stood until 2013.

Broadcasting

Radio
The race was carried live on the IMS Radio Network. Bob Jenkins served as chief announcer for the fourth year. Johnny Rutherford, who missed the broadcast in 1992, returned to serve as "driver expert."

Besides Rutherford, the rest of the crew remained the same from 1991 to 1992.

For the first time, the radio network did not feature a separate live interview with the winner from victory lane. The network simulcast the ABC-TV live interview, which would occur immediately as the driver arrives in victory lane. This allowed the radio audience to hear the first words spoken by the winner, increasing the spontaneity, and prevented the driver from having to repeat an entire interview for a second audience.

Television
The race was carried live flag-to-flag coverage in the United States on ABC Sports. Paul Page served as host and play-by-play announcer, joined by color commentators Bobby Unser and Sam Posey. A slight change came about for 1993. Bobby Unser left the announcing booth, and reported from the turn two position on top of the luxury suites. The move was supposedly to offer a fresh perspective, but others believed it was to separate Unser and Posey, who were known to engage in heated exchanges and debates on-air.

Besides Unser moving his reporting position, the same exact crew, and respective duties, from 1990 to 1992 returned. Bobby Rahal, who failed to qualify for the 1993 race, was invited to be part of the crew, but declined. Two new camera angles debuted, with scaffolding towers erected inside the turns. This was done in part due to construction of new grandstands at the north end of the track and due to the outer retaining fence having been raised. Producers wanted an unobstructed view of the track, and for 1993, desirable camera locations were unavailable on the outside.

Notes

References

Works cited
 1993 Indianapolis 500 Day-By-Day Trackside Report For the Media
 Indianapolis 500 History: Race & All-Time Stats – Official Site
 1993 Indianapolis 500 Radio Broadcast, Indianapolis Motor Speedway Radio Network

Indianapolis 500 races
Indianapolis 500
Indianapolis 500
Indianapolis 500